Christian Tramitz (born 29 July 1955) is a German actor and comedian.

Early life

Born in Munich, Bavaria, Tramitz is the grandson of Austrian actor Paul Hörbiger and first cousin once removed of actress Christiane Hörbiger. His parents are film producer Rudolf Tramitz and Monica ( Hörbiger). Actress Mavie Hörbiger is a cousin.

Instead of starting an acting career at once, he first began to study history of art, philosophy and drama. Apart from that he took lessons in acting from Ruth von Zerboni and violin lessons in the Munich "Musikkonservatorium".

Career
Tramitz made his first media experience at the Munich radio station "Radio Gong", where he, together with Michael "Bully" Herbig presented the program Die Bayern Cops. In December 1996, he appeared in the German television program Isar 3, which was based on the radio show Die Bayern Cops ("The Bavaria Cops"). From 1997 on, he was a member of the German comedy TV series Bullyparade with Herbig and Rick Kavanian.

Tramitz and Friends
After the end of Bullyparade in 2002, Tramitz got his first own comedy show named Tramitz and Friends on the  ProSieben in 2004.

In this show he performed different sketches with various other famous actors including Annett Fleischer, with whom he later filmed the TV series Hubert ohne Staller.

Voice acting

Tramitz used to dub various actors and voice acted different animated characters in the 1980s, like Matt Dillon (for example in Wild Things or One Night at McCool's), Captain Gray Edwards (Final Fantasy, originally spoken by Alec Baldwin), Jackie Chan (Half a Loaf of Kung Fu, Police Story 3), John Cusack (Class), John Ritter (Noises Off), Ben Stiller (If Lucy Fell), David Schwimmer (Six Days, Seven Nights) as well as Ted McGinley as Jefferson D'Arcy in Married... with Children, Jim J. Bullock as Neal Tanner in ALF, Greg Evigan as Jake Cardigan in TekWar as well as Stiletto Mafioso in Danger Mouse.

Apart from that he also gave the old Ted Mosby (narrator) in How I Met Your Mother, Asterix in Asterix and the Vikings and Chick Hicks in Cars his voice.

Thereupon he became the German voice cast of Scrad/Charlie (Johnny Knoxville) in Men in Black II.

Private life

In 2004, Tramitz married his second wife, Annette, and has a daughter and a son with her. He also has twins from his first marriage to German publicist Christiane Tramitz. Christian Tramitz lives in Münsing at Lake Starnberg.

Filmography

Cinema

2000: 2001: Der Schuh des Manitu2004: Traumschiff Surprise – Periode 12004: 7 Dwarves – Men Alone in the Wood2006: Französisch für Anfänger2006: 7 Zwerge – Der Wald ist nicht genug2007: Neues vom Wixxer2007: Lissi und der wilde Kaiser2007: Tell2007: Keinohrhasen2008: Falco – Verdammt, wir leben noch!2008: Freche Mädchen2009: Mord ist mein Geschäft, Liebling2015: Gut zu Vögeln2015: Ghosthunters on Icy Trails (also writer)
2015: Beautiful Girl 2015: Traumfrauen 2017: Bullyparade – Der Film 2018: Feierabendbier 2022: Die Geschichte der Menschheit – leicht gekürztTelevision

1988: 1995: Der Höschenmörder1995: Polizeiruf 110, episode 177, Roter Kaviar1996: Der Bulle von Tölz, episode 5: Tod am Altar (as Father Martin Petermeier)
1997: Der Bulle von Tölz, episode 7: Bei Zuschlag Mord (as auctionator)
1997: Hunger – Sehnsucht nach Liebe1997–2002: Bullyparade2000: Zwei Brüder – Mörderische Rache2002: Finanzamt Mitte – Helden im Amt2002: Was ist bloß mit meinen Männern los?2003: Crazy Race2003: MA 2412 – Die Staatsdiener2004: Tramitz & Friends (2nd Season 2005, 3rd Season 2007)
2006: Agathe kann's nicht lassen – Die Tote im Bootshaus2006: Die ProSieben Märchenstunde – Zwerg Nase2006: Die ProSieben Märchenstunde – Rotkäppchen2006: 2006: Ladyland2006: Rettet die Weihnachtsgans2007: Die ProSieben Märchenstunde – Schneewittchen2007: Die ProSieben Märchenstunde – Des Kaisers neue Kleider2007: Die Schatzinsel2008: H3 – Halloween Horror Hostel2008: Alarm für Cobra 11, episode Auf eigene Faust2011: since 2011: Hubert und StallerDubbing

 1981: Danger Mouse (Stilleto)
 1990: Saber Rider and the Star Sheriffs (Colt)
 1991: Tropical Heat (Nick Sloughter)
 1991-1997: Married... with Children  (Jefferson D'Arcy)
 1991-1992: Darkwing Duck (Steelbeak)
 1995-2001: Xena: Warrior Princess – narrator at the opening
 2000: South Park: Bigger, Longer & Uncut Phillip
 2002: Final Fantasy: The Spirits Within (Captain Gray Edwards)
 2002: Men in Black II (Scrad/Charlie)
 2003: Finding Nemo (Marlin)
 2005: Steamboy 2005: Herbie: Fully Loaded since 2005: How I Met Your Mother (old Ted from 2030, narrator)
 2006: Asterix and the Vikings (Asterix)
 2006: Cars (Chick Hicks)
 2007: Lissi und der wilde Kaiser (Kaiser)
 2008: Tinker Bell (Boble)
 2008: The Simpsons (Sideshow Bob)
 2008: Bolt (Bolt)
 2008: Ponyo'' (Fujimoto)

References

External links 

Living people
1955 births
German male film actors
German male television actors
German male comedians
German male voice actors
20th-century German male actors
21st-century German male actors
Male actors from Munich